Hélène Joy is an Australian-born Canadian actress. She is best known for her work in television series Durham County and Murdoch Mysteries.

Biography
Joy was born in Perth and raised in Australia. She began acting in Kewdale Senior High School in her native Australia. She subsequently toured Europe with a youth theatre company. She spent a year as a theatre major at Curtin University before winning a place at the Western Australian Academy of Performing Arts in Perth where she obtained an acting diploma. She won the Academy’s Leslie Anderson Award for Best Performer.

Career

Television and film
She had minor roles in Australian television series such as: Snowy River: The McGregor Saga (1996), Water Rats (1996–97), Big Sky (1997), and Stingers (1999). After three years, at the urging of her then boyfriend, she moved to Vancouver, British Columbia, Canada.

After arriving in Vancouver, Joy found work on shows such as First Wave (2000), The Outer Limits (2001), The Chris Isaak Show (2002), and The Twilight Zone (2002). In 2003, she landed the lead role of Judy Surgick in the short-lived CBC TV sitcom An American in Canada (2003–04) which was a 2003 Gemini Award nominee for Best Ensemble Performance Comedy Series/Program. In 2005 she appeared in the feature film Desolation Sound.

While still in Vancouver, Joy began landing roles in Toronto, including a supporting role in the TV movie The Murdoch Mysteries:Under the Dragon’s Tail (2004). After moving to Toronto, she played recurring roles in TV series such as This Is Wonderland (2005–06) and ReGenesis (2006). She then starred in Durham County between 2007 and 2010, and appeared as Doc in the primetime soap opera MVP: The Secret Lives of Hockey Wives (2008).

In Christmas 2007, Joy appeared in the fantastical musical film version of the Nutcracker ballet, The Secret of the Nutcracker starring opposite Brian Cox for the CBC. Joy starred in An Old Fashioned Thanksgiving with Jacqueline Bisset for Hallmark in 2008.

Joy has made guest appearances on Heartland, Rookie Blue (2011), Republic of Doyle (2012) and The L.A. Complex (2012) among other programs.

Although she played a different character in Under the Dragon's Tail, the third made-for-television film about William Murdoch and his unique ways of doing detective work, the book's author, Maureen Jennings, was so impressed with Joy's acting ability that she successfully pressed the TV show's producers to select her for the role of Dr. Julia Ogden. As a result, Joy was hired for the part and has played this continuing character in the period detective drama Murdoch Mysteries since 2008.

Theatre
Joy's theatrical career began in Australia with roles in the Shakespeare Program at the Bell Shakespeare Company. She then played a number of roles at the Melbourne Theatre Company: Ophelia in Hamlet, Lady Macbeth in Macbeth, and Juliet in Romeo and Juliet. She made her Canadian theatrical debut in 2012 in Australian playwright Andrew Bovell's Speaking in Tongues at The Company Theatre in Toronto.

Voice acting
She supplied the voice of Sunnyside and Shelly in The Eggs (2004), Gabby and Polly in Faireez (2005), Patsy and Mrs. Berton in The Secret World of Og (2006), Opal in Pearlie (2009), and Vice Principal Victoria in Detentionaire (2012).

Awards and nominations
In 2006, Joy was nominated for a Gemini Award for Best Performance by an Actress in a Featured Supporting Role in a Dramatic Program or Mini-Series for her work in the TV movie The Murdoch Mysteries: Under the Dragon’s Tail as well as being nominated for Best Performance by an Actress in a Guest Role Dramatic Series  for ReGenesis. In 2011, and again in 2012, she was nominated for Outstanding Actress in a Drama Series for her work in Murdoch Mysteries by the Monte-Carlo TV Festival Awards.

She won a Leo Award in 2005 for Best Lead Performance by an Actress in a Feature Length Drama for her role in Desolation Sound.

She won the Gemini Award for Best Performance by an Actress in a Continuing Leading Dramatic Role in 2008 for her role in Durham County.

Personal life 

Joy left Australia and followed her boyfriend to his native Vancouver. She has been a vegan and enjoys travelling all over the world during her time off. Joy trained and is licensed as a real estate agent in Australia; she has subsequently taken up property development.

In late December 2021, Joy gave birth to a daughter, Harrison Joy.

Filmography

Film

Television

References

External links

 

Living people
Actresses from Perth, Western Australia
Actresses from Vancouver
Australian emigrants to Canada
Australian film actresses
Australian television actresses
Australian voice actresses
Best Actress in a Drama Series Canadian Screen Award winners
Canadian film actresses
Canadian television actresses
Canadian voice actresses
Year of birth missing (living people)